Titus Manlius Torquatus may refer to four Roman Republican consuls of the gens Manlia:

 Titus Manlius Imperiosus Torquatus, consul in 347, 344, and 340 BC.
 Titus Manlius Torquatus, grandson of the above, consul in 299 BC who died in office.
 Titus Manlius Torquatus, great-grandson of the above, consul in 235 and 224 BC.
 Titus Manlius Torquatus, grandson of the above, consul in 165 BC.

See also
Manlia (gens)